Ricardo López Cepero is a Puerto Rican politician and former mayor of Culebra. López is affiliated with the New Progressive Party (PNP) and served as mayor from 2011 to 2013.

References

Living people
Mayors of places in Puerto Rico
New Progressive Party (Puerto Rico) politicians
People from Culebra, Puerto Rico
Year of birth missing (living people)